Mohamed Réda Babouche (born July 3, 1979 in Skikda) is an Algerian footballer.

International career
On June 12, 2005, Babouche made his debut for the Algerian National Team as a second-half substitute in a 3–0 friendly loss against Mali.

Babouche was a member of Algeria's team at the 2010 Africa Cup of Nations in Angola. He made just one appearance in the competition, starting in the third-place match against Nigeria.

Honours
 Won the Algerian Cup twice with MC Alger in 2006, 2007
 Won the Algerian Super Cup twice with MC Alger in 2006, 2007
 Won the Algerian Championnat National once with MC Alger 2010

References

External links
 DZFoot Profile
 
 

1979 births
Living people
Algerian footballers
Association football defenders
Algeria international footballers
2010 Africa Cup of Nations players
MC Alger players
Sportspeople from Skikda
Algerian Ligue Professionnelle 1 players
Algeria A' international footballers
MO Constantine players
CA Batna players
CA Bordj Bou Arréridj players
21st-century Algerian people